Parornix kalmiella is a moth of the family Gracillariidae. It is known from Canada (Nova Scotia and Québec) the United States (Connecticut, Pennsylvania, Maine and Vermont).

The larvae feed on Kalmia angustifolia. They mine the leaves of their host plant. The mine has the form of a pale, orange colored blotch mine on the upperside of the leaf.

References

Parornix
Moths of North America
Moths described in 1907